Golden Suits is the solo project of Fred Nicolaus, a member of the indie rock band Department of Eagles.

History
In 2011, Nicolaus began writing songs outside of the Department of Eagles project, inspired by an eventful year in his life as well as the works of fiction writer John Cheever. Over the course of two years he recorded his first solo record, enlisting the help of fellow Department of Eagles member Daniel Rossen, Grizzly Bear members Chris Bear and Chris Taylor, and several other Brooklyn musicians.  The self-titled record was released in 2013 on Yep Roc Records. A sophomore album, "Kubla Khan," was released in 2016. 

The name of a project is a reference to a line in the Cheever short story "The Country Husband." In 2014 Nicolaus filmed a video for the single "Swimming in '99" in which he attempted to buy every copy of The Stories Of John Cheever available for sale in Manhattan in one day. He later wrote about the experience for the magazine Radio Silence.

Discography
Golden Suits CD and LP, Yep Roc 2014
Kubla Khan CD and LP, Hit City USA 2016

Reviews
Pitchfork
Drowned in Sound 
The 405
Allmusic Guide
NME

References

External links
Official Website

Indie rock musical groups from New York (state)
Musical groups from Brooklyn
Yep Roc Records artists